"It was a dark and stormy night" is an often-mocked and parodied phrase considered to represent "the archetypal example of a florid, melodramatic style of fiction writing", also known as purple prose.

Origin 
The status of the sentence as an archetype for bad writing comes from the first phrase of the opening sentence (incipit) of English novelist Edward Bulwer-Lytton's 1830 novel Paul Clifford:

Evaluations of the opening sentence 
Writer's Digest described this sentence as "the literary posterchild for bad story starters". On the other hand, the American Book Review ranked it as No. 22 on its "Best first lines from novels" list.

In 2008, Henry Lytton-Cobbold, a descendant of Bulwer-Lytton, participated in a debate in the town of Lytton, British Columbia, with Scott Rice, the founder of the International Bulwer-Lytton Fiction Contest. Rice accused Bulwer-Lytton of writing "27 novels whose perfervid turgidity I intend to expose, denude, and generally make visible." Lytton-Cobbold defended his ancestor, noting that he had coined many other phrases widely used today such as "the pen is mightier than the sword", "the great unwashed", and "the almighty dollar". He said that it was "rather unfair that Professor Rice decided to name the competition after him for entirely the wrong reasons." The phrase "the almighty dollar", however, had been used earlier by Washington Irving.

Later usage

Literature 

The Peanuts comic strip character Snoopy, in his imagined persona as the World Famous Author, sometimes begins his novels with the phrase "It was a dark and stormy night." Cartoonist Charles Schulz made Snoopy use this phrase because "it was a cliché, and had been one for a very long time". A book by Schulz, titled Snoopy and "It Was a Dark and Stormy Night" includes a novel credited to Snoopy as author, was published by Holt, Rinehart, and Winston in 1971.

Janet and Allan Ahlberg wrote a book titled It Was a Dark and Stormy Night in which a kidnapped boy must keep his captors entertained with his storytelling.

It is the opening line in the popular 1962 novel A Wrinkle in Time by Madeleine L'Engle. L'Engle biographer Leonard Marcus notes that "With a wink to the reader, she chose for the opening line of A Wrinkle in Time, her most audaciously original work of fiction, that hoariest of cliches ... L'Engle herself was certainly aware of old warhorse's literary provenance as ... Edward Bulwer-Lytton's much maligned much parodied repository of Victorian purple prose, Paul Clifford." While discussing the importance of establishing the tone of voice at the beginning of fiction, Judy Morris notes that L'Engle's A Wrinkle in Time opens with "Snoopy's signature phrase".

Recursive version 
There are a variety of recursive stories based on the quote where one character tells another character a story which itself begins with the same opening line. An example would be "It was a dark and stormy night and the Captain said to the mate, Tell us a story mate, and this is the story. It was a dark and stormy night......etc" The stories often feature a character named Antonio, and they have been in existence since at least 1900.

Music 
Kerry Turner: Twas a Dark and Stormy Night, Op. 12 (1987, rev. 2019), different versions.
Joni Mitchell's song Crazy Cries of Love on her album Taming the Tiger opens with "It was a dark and stormy night". In the December 1998 issue of Musician, Mitchell discusses her idea of using several cliche lines in the lyrics of multiple songs on the album, such as "the old man is snoring" in the title song Taming the Tiger. Her co-lyricist, Don Fried, had read of a competition in The New Yorker to write a story opening with "It was a dark and stormy night" and was inspired to put it in the lyrics of Crazy Cries of Love. Mitchell states:

Board game 
In the board game It Was a Dark and Stormy Night, players are given first lines of various famous novels and must guess their origin. Originally sold independently in bookstores in the Chicago area, it was later picked up by the website Goodreadsgames.com.

Writing contest 
The annual Bulwer-Lytton Fiction Contest was formed in 1982. The contest, sponsored by the English Department at San Jose State University, recognizes the worst examples of "dark and stormy night" writing. It challenges entrants to compose "the opening sentence to the worst of all possible novels." The "best" of the resulting entries have been published in a series of paperback books, starting with It Was a Dark and Stormy Night in 1984.

Software 
Version 3.6.2 of the statistical programming language, R, has the codename "Dark and Stormy Night." R release names appear to be Peanuts references, in this instance to the character Snoopy's abortive attempts to write a novel and his hackneyed opening sentence of choice.

See also 

 Once upon a time

References 

Narratology
Quotations from literature
1830s neologisms
English phrases
1830 introductions
Edward Bulwer-Lytton